Temirtau is a city in the Karaganda Region of Kazakhstan. The population was 170,481 in the 1999 census, rising to 210,590 in 2015.

The city is located on the Nura River (the Samarkand Reservoir), northwest of Karaganda.

History
The first groups of settlers to settle in the area were 40 families from Samara (see Stolypin reform), who settled on the left bank of the Nura River on 15 June 1905. The settlement they founded was named Zhaur (Жаур), after a hill on the other side of the river. In 1909 the settlement was renamed Samarkandsky (Самаркандский, or Samarkand for short). The first school and the first hospital were built in 1911.

In 1933 the Samarkandsky-Karaganda water conduit was built to facilitate the development of the Karaganda coal field. In 1939 a  dam was constructed across the Nura River, creating the Samarkand water reservoir, which would remain until 1961. Construction of the Karaganda State Regional Electric Power Station began in 1934, and the first turbine came online in 1942. In 1944, despite being still under construction, the Kazakh Steel Mill yielded its first steel, smelted in an open-hearth Siemens-Martin furnace.

The Samarkand settlement was granted city status on 1 October 1945, and renamed Temirtau ("Iron Mountain" in Kazakh). From 1947 to 1949 Japanese prisoners-of-war were kept in a camp near the town. In 1950 the Karaganda Steel Mill was founded. To build it the Soviet Union announced a "Nationwide High-Intensive Construction Project", and many young "shock-worker brigades" were brought from all over the Soviet Union and ally countries, including many from Bulgaria. In 1959 there were a series of riots and insurrections among the workers, who were highly dissatisfied with the poor working and living conditions and the interruptions in the supply of water, food, goods, tools and other resources as a result of mistakes by the administration. 16 workers were killed in the clashes, and 27 wounded, with 70 arrested and convicted. 28 police were also wounded in the fighting.

In 1960, blast furnace No. 1 yielded its first cast iron. In 1963 the Karaganda Polytechnical Institute (now Karaganda Metallurgical Institute) was founded as a Higher Technical Educational Institution attached to the Karaganda Steel Mill. During the 1970s a new sports complex was built, including a 50m swimming pool, a 15,000 capacity stadium, and an indoor ice-skating and hockey rink. In 1972 the "Metallurgists' Palace of Culture" was opened in the town, followed in 1978 by the "Vostok" recreational park, situated in the eastern part of the city and opened to the public. On 29 July 1978 a Warrior Monument with an Eternal Flame was dedicated to the soldiers from Temirtau who had been killed in World War II.

In 1984 a new residential area was developed, named Zenica in honour of Temirtau's twin-town of that name in Bosnia and Herzegovina. In January 1993 a new Winter Garden was added to Vostok Park. In 1995 the Karaganda Steel Mill was transferred to Ispat International, renamed Ispat-KarMet and eventually became the current Mittal Steel Temirtau, controlled by the ArcelorMittal group. In January 2018, black snow fell in the city near the plant, and local citizens complained that the pollution was caused by emissions from the plant. A spokesperson for ArcelorMittal said that the discoloration of the snow was caused by a lack of wind, which would otherwise blow the pollution away.

Sports

Temirtau sent a bandy team to the Winter Sports Tournaments in Karaganda.

The town is home to FC Bolat football club, which plays in the Kazakhstan First Division.

Sister cities

 Zenica, Bosnia and Herzegovina
 Kamianske, Ukraine

References

External links

 Temirtau.kz

 
Cities and towns in Kazakhstan
Populated places in Karaganda Region
Populated places established in 1905
1905 establishments in the Russian Empire